Pierce Mason Butler (April 11, 1798August 20, 1847) was an American soldier and statesman who served as the 56th Governor of South Carolina from 1836 to 1838. He was killed while serving as colonel of the Palmetto Regiment at the Battle of Churubusco, during the Mexican–American War.

Born in Edgefield County, South Carolina, Butler was a son of William Butler (1759–1821) and a brother of Andrew Pickens Butler and William Butler, Jr., all of whom served in the United States Congress. He was educated by Moses Waddel at the Willington Academy in Willington, South Carolina.

Butler was appointed a second lieutenant in the United States Army in 1818 and rose to the rank of captain before resigning his commission in 1829. Following his term as Governor of South Carolina, he became agent to the Cherokee at Fort Gibson (present day Muskogee County, Oklahoma), a post he held until 1846.

Following his death in Mexico, Butler's body was returned to South Carolina for burial. He was first entombed at Trinity Episcopal Church, just across from the State House. In December 1853 he was reburied in the Butler Family Cemetery, in the graveyard of what is now Butler Methodist Church in Saluda County. Others buried in the plot are his father, Major General William Butler, his mother, Behethland Foote Moore Butler, a sister, five of his six brothers, Colonel Zachariah Smith Brooks, grandfather of Preston Brooks, and two children of his brother William, the only sibling not buried there. He is buried at Christ Episcopal Church in Greenville. Collectively they were four Colonels, one General, one Lt. Colonel, three Majors, and one Judge and US Senator. The General was a member of Congress, too.

James C. Gardner, who served from 1954 to 1958 as the mayor of Shreveport, Louisiana, is a descendant of Pierce Mason Butler.

See also
 Christopher Werner, maker of the "Iron Palmetto" commemorating the loss of South Carolinians in the War

References

External links
 SCIway Biography of Pierce Mason Butler
 NGA Biography of Pierce Mason Butler

1798 births
1847 deaths
United States Army colonels
Democratic Party governors of South Carolina
University of South Carolina trustees
American military personnel killed in the Mexican–American War
United States Indian agents
Butler-Belmont family
People from Edgefield County, South Carolina
19th-century American politicians